The Rugby League Players Association is a representative organisation based in Australia. The RLPA, as it is more commonly referred to, is the representative body of elite rugby league players, protecting and promoting the welfare and interests of its members.

Formerly the Rugby League Professionals Association, the company changed its name in 2009.

Leadership
Former Newcastle Knights captain Tony Butterfield was appointed RLPA CEO in 2000.

Former Western Reds and Penrith Panthers player Matthew Rodwell served as CEO for a brief period up until 2009.

In 2009, David Garnsey took the reins as Chief Executive Officer through until 2015.

In December 2015, former Carlton Football Club player and AFLPA general manager of Player Relations Ian Prendergast was appointed chief executive officer of the RLPA.

In 2017, Australian, Queensland and Melbourne Storm captain Cameron Smith was appointed General President of the RLPA, taking over from Clint Newton who continued with the organisation in the role of general manager of Player Relations.

In 2020, Prendergast departed the RLPA and Newton was appointed Chief Executive Officer.

RLPA board of directors 
The current RLPA board of Directors consists of players and industry professionals. The most recent additions were Josh Hodgson, Chelsea Lenarduzzi, Stuart Nelson, and Joanne Taylor during 2022.
 Deidre Anderson (Chair)
 Daly Cherry-Evans (General President)
 Clint Newton (CEO and Managing Director)
 Chelsea Lenarduzzi
 Pippa Leary
Wade Graham
Josh Hodgson
Hannah Southwell
 Christian Welch
 Steven Harker AM
 Stuart Nelson
 Joanne Taylor

The Players' Champion 
The Rugby League Players' Association's annual awards ceremony, The Players' Champion, recognises the best player in the National Rugby League as voted by their peers.

Four-time winner of the award Johnathan Thurston, described the Players' Champion as "the highest accolade a player can get."

In 2019, the first Players' Champion accolade was awarded to an NRLW player, with Jessica Sergis taking out the inaugural honour.

Previous winners

Collective Bargaining Agreement 
In November 2017, the RLPA negotiated a new Collective Bargaining Agreement with the National Rugby League that secured the biggest pay increase for players in the game's 109-year history.

The new CBA deal captures a range of employment related clauses for a five-year period, beginning in 2018 through until 2022.

In a show of unity and solidarity behind the RLPA in the ongoing negotiations, NRL players wore branded caps throughout State of Origin press conferences and green tape in Round 21 of the 2017 season. RLPA CEO Ian Prendergast stated it "was no secret players had become increasingly frustrated" by negotiations. "They want to stand up, use their voice and demonstrate their solidarity across the weekend to get this deal over the line so we can deliver certainty in the industry."

References

External links
 Rugby League Players Association

Rugby league in Australia
Sports trade unions
National Rugby League
NRL Women's Premiership
NRL Under-20s
Trade unions in Australia
Trade unions established in 1979
1979 establishments in Australia